Abortion in the Central African Republic is prohibited by law unless the pregnancy is the result of rape. According to general medical practice, the medical procedure is only legal if the abortion will save the woman's life, 
though this is not explicitly stated in any law. Anyone who performs an abortion faces up to five years in prison and a fine, and physicians risk losing their medical licenses for up to five years.

History 
Prior to 2006, law in the Central African Republic explicitly outlawed abortion. In 2006, the National Assembly legalized abortion in cases of rape, as women regularly faced sexual violence, rape, and gang rape in the war-ravaged country.

Women's health implications 
Women with unwanted pregnancies in the Central African Republic do not have legal access to abortion. They still seek reproductive health care, but Doctors Without Borders says that the women often resort to conditions that are not sterile or medically safe.

References 

Healthcare in the Central African Republic
Central African Republic
Central African Republic
Women's rights in the Central African Republic